My Mother-in-Law is a 1993 Vietnamese telefilm adapted from Nguyễn Minh Chính's October 1993 short story of the same name.

Plot
Right after the wedding, Thuận's husband goes to the front line leaving no time for them to have a baby. Then, Thuận (Chiều Xuân) meets commune officer Lực (Trần Lực) and they fall in love. Thuận ends up having Lực's daughter. Thuận's mother-in-law (Thu An) finds out and advises her to break up with Lực, while keeping the child a secret. Lực volunteers to join the army and dies in battle. Thuận is reported to be well and her mother-in-law guides the niece-granddaughter to visit her own father's grave.

Production
Production was executed in the Đông Anh District, lasting about 1 month in 1993. The film was produced by Vietnam Television Film Center and directed by Nguyễn Khải Hưng.

Art
 Camera: Huy Thuần
 Design: Lê Liên, Hồ Đồng
 Sound: Hồng Sơn, Mạnh Kiên
 Make-up: Minh Thu
 Costume: Trần Văn
 Light: Minh Hoàng, Minh Châu
 Video technology: Xuân Vũ, Hoàng Sơn

Music
 Theme song My mother by Vũ Thảo

Cast

 Thu An ... Mrs Hòa – Thuận's mother-in-law
 Chiều Xuân ... Thuận
 Trần Lực ... Lực
 Thanh Thúy
 Văn Hiệp
 Tuyết Liên
 Phạm Đôn
 Phát Triệu
 Thanh Bình

Broadcast
My Mother-in-Law released during the Sunday Show (Văn nghệ chủ nhật) of VFC+VTV in summer 1994 and quickly became the "phenomenon" of 90's Vietnamese television. Lead actress Thu An was named as My mother-in-law or The best mother-in-law of the Gulf of Tonkin (Bà mẹ chồng tốt nhất vịnh Bắc Bộ) by fans.

References

External links 

 Nhớ về phim Mẹ chồng tôi từng lấy nước mắt của khán giả 23 năm về trước
 Truyện mẹ chồng – nàng dâu gây bão màn ảnh từ hơn 20 năm trước đến nay
 Bà mẹ chồng mẫu mực nhất màn ảnh Việt thương con dâu đến mức nào
 Dàn diễn viên phim Mẹ chồng tôi sau 23 năm phát sóng

Vietnamese telenovelas
Films based on works by Vietnamese writers
1993 films